Yekaterina Ektova (Kazakh: Екатерина Эктова; born 30 August 1992) is a Kazakhstani athlete specialising in the triple jump. She represented her country at the 2016 Summer Olympics without qualifying for the final.

Her personal bests in the event are 14.16 metres outdoors (+1.0 m/s, Almaty 2016) and 13.19 metres indoors (Karaganda 2012).

International competitions

References

1992 births
Living people
Kazakhstani female triple jumpers
Athletes (track and field) at the 2016 Summer Olympics
Olympic athletes of Kazakhstan
Kazakhstani people of Russian descent
Competitors at the 2013 Summer Universiade